Rainer Forss (20 October 1930 – 2 August 2005) was a Finnish professional football forward, manager and coach. He won full, Olympic and B caps for Finland at international level and was a member of Finland's 1952 Summer Olympics squad. In addition to playing 12 Suomensarja seasons, he scored 43 goals in 72 Mestaruussarja appearances.

Personal life 
Forss is a member of a football family. His son (Tero) and grandsons Marcus and Niclas are all involved in football.

Honours

As a player 
Pyrkivä Turku
 Mestaruussarja: 1954

As a manager 
TPS
 Mestaruussarja: 1968

As an individual 
 Mestaruussarja top-scorer: 1953

References 

1930 births
2005 deaths
Finnish footballers
Association football forwards
Finland international footballers
Finnish football managers
Mestaruussarja players
Mestaruussarja managers
TPS Turku football managers
Turun Palloseura footballers
Finland B international footballers
Turun Toverit players
Pargas Idrottsförening players